Kateřina Hromádková (Keclíková) (born 26 June 1986) is a Czech handballer Coach in Sokol Písek.

References

1986 births
Living people
Czech female handball players
Sportspeople from Písek